Hugh Halsey (June 26, 1794 – May 29, 1858) was an American lawyer and politician from New York.

Life
He was the son of Dr. Stephen Halsey, Jr., and Hamutal (Howell) Halsey (ca. 1762-1848). He graduated from Yale College. Then he studied law with Franklin Viele in Waterford, New York, was admitted to the bar and commenced practice in Madison County, New York.

He was a member of the New York State Assembly (Suffolk Co.) in 1822 and 1824. He was Surrogate of Suffolk County from 1827 to 1840; and First Judge of the County Court from 1833 to 1847. He was a presidential elector in 1844, voting for James K. Polk and George M. Dallas. Halsey was New York State Surveyor General from 1845 until the end of 1847.

He was a member of the New York State Senate (1st D.) in 1854 and 1855, elected on the Hard and Temperance tickets.

He died on May 29, 1858 in Bridgehampton, New York.

Sources
STATE ELECTION; THE LATEST RETURNS in NYT on November 12, 1853
The New York Civil List compiled by Franklin Benjamin Hough (pages 37f, 278, 365 and 418; Weed, Parsons and Co., 1858)
DeWitt Clinton and the Rise of the People's Men by Craig Hanyan, Mary L. Hanyan (McGill-Queen's Press, 1996,  ; page 121)

1794 births
1858 deaths
People from Bridgehampton, New York
Democratic Party New York (state) state senators
New York State Engineers and Surveyors
1844 United States presidential electors
New York (state) state court judges
Yale College alumni
Democratic Party members of the New York State Assembly
19th-century American judges